Omphreus is a genus of beetles in the family Carabidae, containing the following species:

 Omphreus adriaenssensi  Lassalle, 1998
 Omphreus aetolicus  Apfelbeck, 1904
 Omphreus apfelbecki  Reitter, 1893
 Omphreus bischoffi  Meschnigg, 1934
 Omphreus bjelasicensis  Curcic, 2008
 Omphreus chareti  Lassalle, 1995
 Omphreus gracilis  Apfelbeck, 1918
 Omphreus korbi  Ganglbauer, 1887
 Omphreus krueperi  Reitter, 1885
 Omphreus lonai  Winkler, 1933
 Omphreus morio  Dejean, 1828
 Omphreus ovcarensis  Curcic et al., 2008
 Omphreus prekornicensis  Curcic, 2008
 Omphreus prunierorum  Lassalle, 1998
 Omphreus revasinii  J. Muller, 1923
 Omphreus serbooccidentalis  Curcic et al., 2008
 Omphreus weiratheri  Winkler, 1933
 Omphreus wohlberedti  Winkler, 1933

References

Platyninae